Sofiane Hanitser (born 20 November 1984) is an Algerian former football player.

Club career
During the 2009–10 Algerian Championnat National, Hanitser finished as the second top scorer of the league with 16 goals in 32 games, one goal less than MC Alger's Hadj Bouguèche.

International career
Hanitser was a member of the Algerian Under-23 National Team at the 2005 Islamic Solidarity Games in Saudi Arabia. In the opening game against Palestine, he scored two goals as Algeria went on to win the game 3-0. He played in Algeria's remaining games at the competition but did not score. Hanitser was also a member of the team at the 2005 Mediterranean Games in Almeria, Spain. In the opening game, he scored two goals against Tunisia, with the game ending 2-2 and Algeria winning the penalty shoot-out 5-4.

On 4 June 2006 Hanitser made his debut for the Algerian National Team in a friendly against Sudan. Hanitser started the game on the bench and replaced Lazhar Hadj Aïssa in the 76th minute as Algeria went on to win the game 1-0.

References

External links
 Review of 07/08 season at official MC Oran site
 DZFoot Profile
 

1984 births
Living people
Algerian footballers
Algeria international footballers
USM Alger players
MC Oran players
USM El Harrach players
Algeria A' international footballers
ASM Oran players
Algeria under-23 international footballers
People from Oran Province
Algerian Ligue Professionnelle 1 players
Competitors at the 2005 Mediterranean Games
Association football midfielders
Mediterranean Games competitors for Algeria
21st-century Algerian people